Herbert Tirrell Winterhalder (1879 – 1946) was an English footballer who played in the Football League for Sheffield United, and the Southern League for Kettering, Plymouth Argyle, Wellingborough and West Ham United. He was an outside forward.

References

1879 births
Sportspeople from Kettering
English footballers
Association football forwards
Kettering Town F.C. players
Sheffield United F.C. players
Plymouth Argyle F.C. players
Wellingborough Town F.C. players
West Ham United F.C. players
English Football League players
Southern Football League players
Western Football League players
1946 deaths